Elementos de derecho público provincial Argentino is an 1852 Argentine book by Juan Bautista Alberdi. It is a comparison between the Argentine Constitution of 1826 and the United States Constitution. The book complements his other book Bases y puntos de partida para la organización política de la República Argentina, which influenced the Constitution of Argentina of 1853.

Bibliography
 

Books by Juan Bautista Alberdi
1852 books
United States constitutional commentary